CenturyTel of Northwest Arkansas, LLC is a telephone operating of CenturyLink providing local telephone services to northwest Arkansas, Missouri, and Oklahoma. The company was founded in 1999 when CenturyTel purchased access lines in Arkansas from GTE which had been a part of GTE Southwest.

The company, in 2009, began doing business as CenturyLink.

See also
GTE
CenturyLink

References

Lumen Technologies
American companies established in 1999
Communications in Arkansas
Communications in Missouri
Communications in Oklahoma
Telecommunications companies of the United States 
Telecommunications companies established in 1999
1999 establishments in Arkansas